László Pusztai (1 March 1946 – 6 July 1987) was a Hungarian football player who participated in the 1978 World Cup where Hungary was eliminated in the first round.

After having spent numerous years in the Budapest clubs of Budapest Honvéd FC and Ferencvárosi TC, he went to Austria where he played for Eisenstadt for 3 years.

He was killed in a car accident, together with his wife, leaving two children behind.

References 
István László Pusztai
 FIFA Official Website
Eisenstadt

1946 births
1987 deaths
Hungarian footballers
Hungary international footballers
Budapest Honvéd FC players
Ferencvárosi TC footballers
1978 FIFA World Cup players
People from Szentes
Road incident deaths in Hungary
Association football forwards
Sportspeople from Csongrád-Csanád County